The Men's EuroHockey Junior Championship is a men's international under-21 field hockey tournament organized by the European Hockey Federation. The tournament has been held since 1977 and serves as a qualification tournament for the Men's FIH Hockey Junior World Cup.

Competition format
The tournament usually comprises 8 teams, while some editions have featured more and less. 

Teams are split into two pools, playing in a round-robin format. The top two teams in each pool move forward to contest the medal matches, while the bottom two (or more) teams playoff to avoid relegation to the EuroHockey Junior Championship II.

Championship I

Results

Summary

* = hosts

Team appearances

Championship II

Results

Summary

* = hosts

Team appearances

Championship III

Results

Summary

* = hosts

Team appearances

See also
 Men's EuroHockey Championship
 Women's EuroHockey Junior Championship

Notes

References

External links
Official website
All results

 
EuroHockey Junior Championship
EuroHockey Junior Championship
Hockey
EuroHockey Junior Championship
EuroHockey Junior Championship